Reticunassa jeanmartini is a species of sea snail, a marine gastropod mollusk in the family Nassariidae, the Nassa mud snails or dog whelks.

Description
The length of the shell varies between 5 mm and 8 mm.

Distribution
This species occurs in the Indian Ocean off Mauritius and La Réunion.

References

External links
 Galindo L.A., Kool H.H. & Dekker H. (2017). Review of the Nassarius pauperus (Gould, 1850) complex (Nassariidae): Part 3, reinstatement of the genus Reticunassa, with the description of six new species. European Journal of Taxonomy. 275: 1-43
 

Nassariidae
Gastropods described in 2006